Pangio filinaris is a species of ray-finned fish in the genus Pangio.

References

 

Pangio
Fish described in 1993